Dame Sheila Margaret Imelda Quinn, DBE, FRCN, RGN, RM, RNT (16 September 1920–8 December 2016), was a British nurse and fellow of the Royal College of Nursing. She was president of the Royal College of Nursing (RCN) from 1982 to 1986. She was awarded an RCN Fellowship (FRCN) in 1978.

Born in Blackpool, England, she was educated at the Convent of the Holy Child, Jesus (Layton Hill Convent, Blackpool), now known as St Mary's Catholic High School (Blackpool).

International work and honours
From 1961 to 1970, Quinn served on the administrative staff of the International Council of Nurses (ICN), of which she was executive director from 1967 to 1970. She was an ICN representative to the International Labour Organization.

She also acted as a consultant to the World Health Organization. Throughout her career, she was chief nursing officer (CNO) to the Southampton University Hospitals NHS Trust, regional nursing officer (RNO) for the Wessex Regional Health Authority, and chief nursing advisor for the British Red Cross. 

She was appointed Commander of the Most Excellent Order of the British Empire (CBE) and later elevated to Dame Commander (DBE) by Queen Elizabeth II. In 1993, the ICN awarded her the Christiane Reimann Prize, which is given every four years for outstanding contribution to the profession. Dame Sheila contributed significantly to the Problem Solving for Better Health (PSBH) program at the Dreyfus Health Foundation (DHF) since 1995.

She helped found The Brendoncare Foundation for Total Care of the Elderly in the mid-1980s.

The Quinn Centre, which was named in her honour, was established in 2002 to respond to the training and information needs of the domiciliary care sector.

Death
She died on 8 December 2016 at the age of 96 at Southampton General hospital.

References

1920 births
2016 deaths
English nurses
British nursing administrators
British people of Irish descent
British Roman Catholics
Dames Commander of the Order of the British Empire
People from Blackpool
Fellows of the Royal College of Nursing
Presidents of the Royal College of Nursing
British nurses